WPTM (102.3 FM) is a radio station broadcasting a country music format. Licensed to Roanoke Rapids, North Carolina, United States, it serves the  area.  The station is currently owned by John Byrne, through licensee Byrne Acquisition Group, LLC.

External links

PTM